The Cyprus Regiment was a military unit of the  British Army. Created by the British Government during  World War II, it was made up of volunteers from the Greek Cypriot, Turkish Cypriot, Armenian, Maronite and Latin inhabitants of Cyprus, but also included other Commonwealth nationalities.

The badge of the Cyprus Regiment was a shield charged with two lions passant guardant in pale and ensigned with the Imperial Crown and below the shield was a scroll bearing the title of the regiment.

Service history
The Cyprus Regiment was founded on 12 April 1940. It included Infantry, Mechanical, Transport and Pack Transport Companies. Cypriot mule drivers were the first colonial troops sent to the Western Front.  They served in France, Ethiopia, Palestine, and Italy carrying equipment to areas inaccessible to vehicles. They were used to supply and support other troops at Monte Casino.

On a brief visit to Cyprus in 1943, Winston Churchill praised the "soldiers of the Cyprus Regiment who have served honourably on many fields from Libya to Dunkirk."

About 30,000 Cypriots served in the Cyprus Regiment. The regiment was involved in action from the very start and served in the Battle of France, in the Greek Campaign (the Battle of Greece, in which about 600 soldiers were captured at Kalamata, in 1941), North Africa (Operation Compass), France, the Middle East and Italy. Many soldiers were taken prisoner especially at the beginning of the war and were interned in various POW camps, including Stalag VIII-B Lamsdorf, Stalag IV-C at Wistritz near Teplitz (now in the Czech Republic), and Stalag IV-B near Dresden. The soldiers captured in Kalamata were transported by train to prisoner of war camps.

In the post-war years the regiment served in Cyprus and the Middle East, including Palestine during the 1945-1948 period. The regiment was disbanded on 31 March 1950.

References

Sources
 Panyiotou, Nicos. Cyprus' participation in World War II.  Nicosia : Theopres Press Ltd., 1985.
 50th anniversary of The Cyprus Regiment, 1939-1945.  Nicosia : Republic of Cyprus Press & Information Office, 1990
 London Gazette : Operations in the Middle East from August, 1939 to November, 1940 (Publication date: 11 June 1946 Supplement: 37609 Page: 2997) (
 Jackson, Ashley. The British Empire and the Second World War
 The Commonwealth War Graves Commission

External links
 Cyprus Regiment History
 Cyprus Veterans' Association 
 Cyprus Armed Forces
 Kazamias, Georgios. Military Recruitment and Selection in a British Colony: The Cyprus Regiment 1939–1944
 Imperial War Museum : Cypriots Serving with the British Forces
 The participation of Cypriots in World War II
 Turkish Cypriots in World War II
 Operation Compass (1940-1941): Orders of Battle
 The Wartime Memories Project - Stalag IV-B POW Camp
 Commonwealth War Graves Commission : Cyprus Regiment
 New medals for WWII veteran who lost originals in 1974 
 Robert Menzies’ 1941 Diary : The Greek campaign 
 Official Programme of the Victory Celebrations, London, England, 8 June 1946
 WW2 Peoples War : Gunner Bellas, POW
  Battle of Crete WO Bill Knox

Battalions of the British Army
Military units and formations established in 1940
Military units and formations disestablished in 1950
Military history of Cyprus
British Cyprus
Cyprus in World War II